Pseudodaphnella nebulosa is a species of sea snail, a marine gastropod mollusk in the family Raphitomidae.

Description
(Original description) The shell is fusiformly oblong, finely ribbed longitudinally, striated transversely, forming regular granules. The sutures are slightly angulated and smooth. The aperture is oval. The outer lip is slightly incurved and serrated on its edges, striated internally. The siphonal canal is slightly produced and recurved. The colour of the shell is white, marked with irregular, interrupted, longitudinal brown
lines.

Distribution
This marine species occurs off Hawaii.

References

External links
 
 Gastropods.com: Pseudodaphnella nebulosa

nebulosa
Gastropods described in 1860